Graham Diamond  (born 18 August 1949,  Manchester, England)  is a speculative fiction, fantasy and science fiction author.

Early life and education
Born in Manchester, England, his family moved to the United States when he was a young child. He was raised in New York City, on the Upper West Side, and graduated from the High School of Music and Art. He attended CCNY in NY, and the Art Students League of New York.

Literary career
'Diner of Lost Souls', a mystery/thriller was released in April 2022. The novel heralds a new series in the thriller genre done in conjunction with Hedy Campeas, and published by Lion Press, New York. The book is available worldwide both as a trade softcover and eBook in all formats. 
In Noverber 2021 'The Haven', 'The Thief of Kalimar', 'Black Midnight', Forest Wars', 'Tears of Passion, Tears of Shame', 'Captain Sinbad' and "Chocolate Lenin' were made available in softcover in the United Kingdom.
In 2020 Lume Books, London, issued a new print version of Maybe You Will Survive to commemorate the 75th anniversary of the ending of the Holocaust. Also an audio version of Maybe You Will Survive was made available.  The book became a bestseller on the Amazon pages regarding the Shoah, and Holocaust Biographies. In April 2020 Vydavatelstvi Vikend Books of the Czech Republic contracted for a hardcopy version of "Maybe You Will Survive" to be published in Czech in late 2021 or early 2022.

Lume Books, London, also became the major e-publisher of all of Graham Diamond's novels in 2019.  Print versions of many were reissued by Lion Press.

Diamond's novel Cry For Freedom became available from Lume Books in 2018.

A fine arts major, Diamond turned to professional writing in his late twenties and is best known for books such as The Haven, Lady of the Haven, The Thief of Kalimar, Black Midnight, Forest Wars, Marrakesh, Samarkand, and Samarkand Dawn. He soon turned to other genres; including historical fiction, thrillers, and later a true story of a Holocaust survivor's family during World War II, Maybe You Will Survive. Several of his early novels were published in the UK by Methuen and much of his work by Endeavour Press and Venture Press in UK.

Under the pen name Rochelle Leslie (the names of his two daughters), he authored Tears of Passion, Tears of Shame, a novel of South Africa set during the Zulu War of 1879 (Berkeley/Jove) which was subsequently published in Italy, titled, Venuto De Lontano, (To Come From Far Away) by Mondadori. He also has had various short stories published in anthologies.

His satire book, Chocolate Lenin, was released in 2012. It is speculative fiction, a well received satire/fantasy of near-future Russia, parodying contemporary science, technology, and politics. It received numerous favorable reviews.
A new site, GrahamDiamondwriter.com, now provides information about him and all of his books.

In 2013 it was announced that his first novel, The Haven, was re-released in a new oversize format. The book is widely considered to be a cult classic. It was previously published in UK and Australia, as well as the United States. Many of his novels remain in print and digital and kindle format. In total Diamond has more than 1,000,000 copies of his books in print.

In 2015 it was announced that Venture Press Ltd, UK, a division of Endeavour Press UK, in the autumn of 2015 made available seven of Graham Diamond's earlier titles, The Haven, Samarkand, Samarkand Dawn, Lady of the Haven, Dungeons of Kuba, The Falcon of Eden and The Beasts of Hades. They will be released in e-book format in the UK, United States, Canada, and across the English-speaking world. The Haven, and Samarkand, were particularly well received.

In 2016, mainstream Endeavour Press published Black Midnight, a terrorist novel set in New York City, and Cry For Freedom, a well-received novel set during the Zulu War in Natal in 1879. In early 2018 Endeavour next released Maybe You Will Survive the true story of a Holocaust survivor

Venture Press then announced that another six of Diamond's speculative fiction/fantasy novels would be published. Titles include, The Thief of Kalimar,, Captain Sinbad, a broad tongue-in-cheek account of the mariner's adventures, Chocolate Lenin, Diamond's humorous view of our current world of technology, science, and greed. In addition, Marrakesh, and Marrakesh Nights, Cinnabar, were also made available.  In all, Graham Diamond has had more than one million books printed in hardcover, trade paperback, and paperback form. Digital copies have dramatically increased that number.

His American publishers have included Fawcett Books, Berkeley/Jove, Playboy Press, Kensington/Zebra, Lion Press, D.A.W.

Diamond also worked for many years at the New York Times as production manager in Editorial Art until leaving to pursue a full-time career in writing. He has taught and lectured on creative writing in both New York and California. He now makes his home in New York City. He continues his writing, citing he will 'never retire'.
His personal website is, GrahamDiamondwriter.com

Select bibliography
Diner of Lost Souls (2022, Lion Press, NY)
The Haven (Playboy Press, Methuen, Venture Press, UK)
Lady of the Haven (Playboy Press, Methuen, Venture Press, UK)
Chocolate Lenin (Lion Books, NY, Venture Press, UK)
Black Midnight (Kensington/Zebra, Endeavour Press, UK)
Tears of Passion, Tears of Shame (Berkley/Jove, Endeavour Press, UK)
Samarkand  (Playboy Press, Venture Press, UK)
Samarkand Dawn (Playboy Press, Venture Press, UK)
Captain Sinbad (Fawcett, Venture Press, UK)
Forest Wars (Lion Press, Venture Press, UK)
Cinnabar  (Fawcett, Venture Press, UK)
Marrakesh (Fawcett, Venture Press, UK)
Marrakesh Nights (Fawcett, Venture Press, UK)
The Falcon of Eden (Playboy Press, Venture Press, UK)
Beasts of Hades  (Playboy Press, Venture Press, UK)
Outcasts (DAW Books anthology)
Maybe You Will Survive (Holocaust Press, 1991, reissued 2010, Endeavour Press 2018)

References

External links
Website

Poets & Writers page on Diamond

20th-century American novelists
21st-century American novelists
American male novelists
American science fiction writers
Living people
1945 births
American male short story writers
20th-century American short story writers
21st-century American short story writers
The High School of Music & Art alumni
20th-century American male writers
21st-century American male writers
Novelists from New York (state)